Daniel Goleman (born March 7, 1946) is an author, psychologist, and science journalist. For twelve years, he wrote for The New York Times, reporting on the brain and behavioral sciences. His 1995 book Emotional Intelligence was on The New York Times Best Seller list for a year and a half, a bestseller in many countries, and is in print worldwide in 40 languages. Apart from his books on emotional intelligence, Goleman has written books on topics including self-deception, creativity, transparency, meditation, social and emotional learning, ecoliteracy and the ecological crisis, and the Dalai Lama’s vision for the future.

Biography
Daniel Goleman grew up in a Jewish household in Stockton, California, the son of Fay Goleman (née Weinberg; 1910–2010), professor of sociology at the University of the Pacific, and Irving Goleman (1898–1961), humanities professor at the Stockton College (now San Joaquin Delta College). His maternal uncle was nuclear physicist Alvin M. Weinberg.

Goleman studied in India using a pre-doctoral fellowship from Harvard and a post-doctoral grant from the Social Science Research Council. While in India, he spent time with spiritual teacher Neem Karoli Baba, who was also the guru to Ram Dass, Krishna Das, and Larry Brilliant.  He wrote his first book based on travel in India and Sri Lanka. He earned his PhD in psychology at Harvard.

Goleman then returned as a visiting lecturer to Harvard, where during the 1970s his course on the psychology of consciousness was popular. David McClelland, his mentor at Harvard, recommended him for a job at Psychology Today, from which he was recruited by The New York Times in 1984.

Goleman co-founded the Collaborative for Academic, Social, and Emotional Learning at Yale University's Child Studies Center, which then moved to the University of Illinois at Chicago. Currently he co-directs the Consortium for Research on Emotional Intelligence in Organizations at Rutgers University. He is on the board of the Mind & Life Institute.

Career

Goleman authored the internationally bestselling book Emotional Intelligence (Bantam Books, 1995), which spent more than a year and a half on The New York Times Best Seller list. In Working with Emotional Intelligence (Bantam Books, 1998), Goleman developed the argument that non-cognitive skills can matter as much as IQ for workplace success, and made a similar argument for leadership effectiveness in Primal Leadership (Harvard Business School Press, 2001). Goleman's most recent bestseller is Focus: The Hidden Driver of Excellence (Harper, 2013).

In his first book, The Varieties of Meditative Experience (1977) (republished in 1988 as The Meditative Mind), Goleman describes almost a dozen different meditation systems. He wrote that "the need for the meditator to retrain his attention, whether through concentration or mindfulness, is the single invariant ingredient in the recipe for altering consciousness of every meditation system".

Awards
Goleman has received many awards, including: 
 Career Achievement award for Excellence in the Media (1984) from the American Psychological Association.
 Fellow of the American Association for the Advancement of Science in recognition of his efforts to communicate the behavioral sciences to the public

Publishing history

Books
 1977: The Varieties of the Meditative Experience, Irvington Publishers. . Republished in 1988 as The Meditative Mind: The Varieties of Meditative Experience, Tarcher/Penguin. 
 1985: Vital Lies, Simple Truths: The Psychology of Self-Deception, Bloomsbury Publishers. 
 1995: Emotional Intelligence: Why It Can Matter More Than IQ, Bantam Books. 
 1998: Working with Emotional Intelligence, Bantam Books. 
 2001: Primal Leadership: Unleashing the Power of Emotional Intelligence, with Richard Boyatzis and Annie McKee, Harvard Business Review Press. 
 2006: Social Intelligence: Beyond IQ, Beyond Emotional Intelligence, Bantam Books. 
 2013: Focus: The Hidden Driver of Excellence, Harper Collins Publishers. 
 2015: A Force for Good: The Dalai Lama's Vision for Our World, Bantam Books. 
 2017: Altered Traits: Science Reveals How Meditation Changes Your Mind, Brain, and Body, with Richard Davidson, Avery. 
 2019: The Emotionally Intelligent Leader, Harvard Business Review Press.

Journal articles (selected)

See also

 Emotional aperture

References

External links

 

21st-century American psychologists
Jewish American social scientists
Emotional intelligence academics
Amherst College alumni
Harvard University alumni
Writers from Stockton, California
Jewish American writers
Mindfulness (Buddhism)
Mindfulness (psychology)
Mindfulness movement
Students of S. N. Goenka
1946 births
Living people
21st-century American Jews
20th-century American psychologists